Spioenkop Dam Nature Reserve or Spion Kop Nature Reserve is a protected area in KwaZulu-Natal, South Africa. The historic battlefield site can be reached by road.

The park was established in 1975.

The climate is temperate, with annual rainfall of about 814 mm per square meter. The rainy season is in the period March-October.

See also
Protected areas of South Africa
Battle of Spion Kop
Spioenkop Dam

References

External links
 Fun Things To Do in Province of KwaZulu-Natal
The Battlefields Route

Nature reserves in South Africa
Protected areas of KwaZulu-Natal